This is a list of railway lines in Portugal.

List

Sources
 

Portugal
Lines